Mapping theorem may refer to
 Continuous mapping theorem, a statement regarding the stability of convergence under mappings
 Mapping theorem (point process), a statement regarding the stability of Poisson point processes under mappings